The Asia/Oceania Zone was one of three zones of regional competition in the 2005 Fed Cup.

Group I
Venue: R.K. Khanna Tennis Complex, New Delhi, India (outdoor hard) 
Date: 20–23 April

The eight teams were divided into two pools of four teams. The teams that finished first and second in the pools played-off to determine which team would partake in the World Group Play-offs. The two nations coming second-last and last in the pools also played-off to determine which two would be relegated to Group II for 2005.

Pools

Play-offs

  advanced to 2005 World Group II Play-offs.

Group II
Venue: R.K. Khanna Tennis Complex, New Delhi, India (outdoor hard) 
Date: 19–21 April

The four teams played in one pool of four, with the two teams placing first and second in the pool advancing to Group I for 2006.

Pool

  and  advanced to Group I for 2006.

See also
Fed Cup structure

References

 Fed Cup Profile, China
 Fed Cup Profile, India
 Fed Cup Profile, Kazakhstan
 Fed Cup Profile, Australia
 Fed Cup Profile, South Korea
 Fed Cup Profile, New Zealand
 Fed Cup Profile, Uzbekistan
 Fed Cup Profile, Philippines
 Fed Cup Profile, Syria

External links
 Fed Cup website

 
Asia Oceania
Sport in New Delhi
Tennis tournaments in India